Costain Group plc is a British construction and engineering company headquartered in Maidenhead, England. Founded in 1865, its history includes extensive housebuilding and mining activities, but it later focused on civil engineering and commercial construction projects. It was part of the British/French consortium which constructed the Channel Tunnel at the end of the 1980s, and has been involved in Private Finance Initiative projects.

History

19th century
The business was founded in 1865 when Richard Costain and his future brother-in-law, Richard Kneen, left the Isle of Man and moved to Liverpool as jobbing builders. The partnership lasted until 1888, when Richard Kneen left and Richard Costain's three sons (Richard, William and John) joined him. By the time of the First World War Costain had expanded through Lancashire and into South Wales, where it built houses for munitions workers.

20th century
After the First World War, Costain began to develop housing estates in Liverpool on its own account, primarily to offer continuity of employment to its workforce. With housing sites in Liverpool in short supply, Richard Costain sent his son William down to London to find new sites. He purchased the Walton Heath Land Company, and in 1923, the separate business of Richard Costain & Sons was formed.

Several executive estates in the Croydon area were developed in the middle of the 1920s. In 1929, William died: the other two brothers remained in Liverpool and William’s son, Richard Rylandes Costain, was sent to run the London company. Under him, Richard Costain & Sons expanded its housing building large estates all around London, the largest being a site for 7,500 homes in South Hornchurch, started in 1934. Perhaps the best known development of all was Dolphin Square, which was completed in 1937.

In 1933, the London based Richard Costain was floated on the London Stock Exchange; the Liverpool business was not part of the flotation. By then, Costain had completed over 4,000 houses in the London area, some at prices up to £4,000. Costain continued to expand its private housebuilding and it was described as "one of the largest speculative housebuilders and estate developers in this country before the war."

Following the flotation, Costain moved into civil engineering and worked first on the Trans-Iranian Railway and then at Abadan, Iran for BP. Losses on the railway, on Beckton sewage works and the costs of Dolphin Square caused financial problems, and Costain had to look for alternative funds when Barclays withdrew its overdraft facilities.

The Second World War saw Costain carrying out extensive military work including airfields and ordnance factories, and it was one of the contractors who built the Mulberry harbour units. Some small estate development was undertaken, but it was not until the acquisition of Nottingham's Rostance Group in 1962 that private housebuilding resumed on any scale.

Helped also by the acquisition of the Blackpool firm of R Fielding in 1969, Costain was building around 1,000 houses a year by the beginning of the 1970s. The substantially increased revenues that accrued to the oil producing states led to a construction boom in the middle east in the 1970s. Costain was a major beneficiary, particularly in the Emirates, and within a decade profits increased from little more than £1m a year to £47m.

In the 1980s, recognising that exceptional Middle East profits could not continue, Costain sought to redeploy its extensive cash balances into coal mining, international housing and commercial property. However, over expansion in the end of the 1980s led to high gearing just as international markets were turning down, problems exacerbated by a disastrous explosion which killed ten people in 1989 at a Costain owned coal mine in the United States, for which the firm was fined $3.75m in February 1993.

In the meantime, in 1985, Costain was part of the TransManche Link consortium that constructed the Channel Tunnel.

Substantial losses were incurred in the beginning of the 1990s, and asset sales followed, leaving Costain as a predominantly construction oriented business. At a dramatic low point in April 1995, the demise of Costain was predicted, incorrectly, by broadsheets in the United Kingdom. It was not expected to survive as an operating company by the end of the century. In 1999, Brewer Gold Mine, a U.S. subsidiary of Costain, abandoned a gold mine in South Carolina, which had been closed, and ceased performing its remediation duties.

21st century
In the early years of the 21st century, Costain worked on the Channel Tunnel Rail Link, including the modernisation of London St Pancras station to accept Eurostar trains, and on the Thameslink, and Crossrail projects in central London; on Crossrail, Costain's contracts included the Paddington  and Bond Street stations (both with Skanska), and the north east network upgrade. In 2010, Costain was named Contractor of the Decade by New Civil Engineer.

Under Andrew Wyllie, CEO from September 2005 to May 2019, Costain invested in technology and consultancy staff, which in March 2018 comprised a third (1,300) of the company's then 4,000 employees. Alex Vaughan succeeded Wyllie as CEO.

In June 2019, a gloomy trading update following delayed and cancelled projects, led to Costain shares slumping over 35%. In December 2019, a court ruling increasing Costain's liabilities on a Welsh road project led the firm to cut its full year profit forecasts; its share price fell 19% in early trading.

On 11 March 2020, Costain announced a £100m rights issue, aiming to strengthen its balance sheet after it suffered a £6.6m pre tax loss on revenues of £1.16 billion in 2019; the news sent Costain shares down 34%, with the plunge continuing the following day, dropping below £1 to 88p. The company was also affected by the COVID-19 pandemic shutdown with major projects (amounting to a third of operating revenue) suspended. As a result, the board and senior leadership team agreed a 30% reduction in salaries and fees for up to three months, while also making other short term economies. In early May, Dubai-based contractor ASGC Construction said it planned to invest £25m in Costain's £100m rights issue, giving it a 15% stake in the group. The rights issue was concluded in late May 2020, with ASGC becoming Costain's biggest shareholder.

In March 2023, Costain announced - after three consecutive years of pre-tax losses - that its results for 2022 showed a pre-tax profit of £34.2m on revenue up 25% at £1,421m (2021: £1,135m).

Structure
Costain's activities are organised into two operating divisions: Natural Resources (water, nuclear process and oil & gas) and Infrastructure (highways, rail and power).

Major projects

Projects undertaken by or involving the Company have included:

the Dolphin Square apartments in London completed in 1937
a section of the Trans-Iranian Railway completed in 1939
the West London Air Terminal completed in 1957
Dubai International Airport completed in 1960
the Deep Water Harbour at Bridgetown, Barbados completed in 1961
Plymouth Law Courts completed in 1963
Enfield Civic Centre in London completed in 1975
the Thames Barrier completed in 1984
the Channel Tunnel completed in 1994
the Tsing Ma Bridge in Hong Kong completed in 1997
the Cardiff Bay Barrage completed in 1999
the Golden Jubilee wing at King's College Hospital completed in 2002
the King's Cross Western Ticketing Hall completed in 2006

Costain is also involved in the redevelopment of Bond Street Station due for completion in 2021 and HS2 lots S1 and S2, working as part of joint venture, due to complete in 2031.

Controversies

Blacklisting
Costain was revealed as a subscriber to the United Kingdom's Consulting Association, exposed in 2009 for operating an illegal construction industry blacklist. It was also later one of the eight businesses involved in the launch in 2013 of the Construction Workers Compensation Scheme, condemned as a "PR stunt" by the GMB union, and described by the Scottish Affairs Select Committee as "an act of bad faith".

In December 2017, trade union Unite announced it had issued High Court proceedings against twelve major contractors, including Costain.

Late payment
In April 2019, Costain was suspended from the UK Government's Prompt Payment Code, for failing to pay suppliers on time. It was reinstated in July 2019.

References

Sources

External links
 Costain Group website

Companies listed on the London Stock Exchange
Construction and civil engineering companies of the United Kingdom
Companies based in Maidenhead
Companies established in 1865
1865 establishments in England
Construction and civil engineering companies established in 1865
British companies established in 1865